Andoas is a village on the Pastaza River in the Loreto Region of Peru. Its location is almost exactly 200 miles south of the equator.

Andoas is near Exploitation Lot 192, one of the oil fields in Peru.

References

External links
OpenStreetMap - Andoas

Populated places in the Loreto Region